Liliane Kerjan (13 February 1940 – 28 June 2021) was a French author. She specialized in American literature.

Biography
Kerjan earned a degree in English from Rennes 2 University and a doctoral degree from Blaise Pascal University in 1977. As part of the Fulbright Program, she was a visiting professor at the University of San Diego and Yale University.

In 2010, she published a biography on Tennessee Williams and another on Arthur Miller in 2012. In 2020, she published Ils ont fait un rêve, a biography on African American authors Richard Wright, Ralph Ellison, and James Baldwin.

Liliane Kerjan died on 28 June 2021 at the age of 81.

Awards and honours
 In 2010, she received the Prix grand Ouest from the Association des Écrivains de l'Ouest.

Books
Albee (1971)
Le théâtre d'Edward Albee (1978)
L'égalité aux États-Unis. Mythes et Réalités (1991)
L'Amérique urbaine des années soixante (1994)
La consommation culturelle dans le monde anglophone (1994)
Voix de femmes à la scène, à l'écran (1994)
Dix-huit ans, vive la liberté ! (2003)
Tennessee Williams (2010)
Ce que je sais d'Arthur Miller (2012)
Fitzgerald : Le désenchanté (2013)
Truman Capote (2015)
George Washington (2015)
Abraham Lincoln (2015)
Ils ont fait un rêve : Richard Wright, Ralph Ellison et James Baldwin : trois grands écrivains contre le racisme (2020)

Decorations
Officer of the Legion of Honour (2013)

References

1940 births
2021 deaths
French writers
French women
Rennes 2 University alumni
Blaise Pascal University alumni
Academic staff of Rennes 2 University
Officiers of the Légion d'honneur